Minuscule 613 (in the Gregory-Aland numbering), α 298 (von Soden), is a Greek minuscule manuscript of the New Testament, on parchment. Palaeographically it has been assigned to the 12th century. The manuscript is lacunose. Formerly it was labeled by 136a and 169p.

Description 

The codex contains the text of the Acts of the Apostles, Catholic epistles, and Pauline epistles on 174 parchment leaves (size ), with lacunae (Hebrews 13:24-25). The text is written in one column per page, 27 lines per page.

It contains the treatise of Pseudo-Dorotheus on the Seventy disciples and twelve apostles (as codices 82, 93, 177, 459, 617, 699).

The order of books: Acts, Catholic epistles, and Pauline epistles. Hebrews is placed after Epistle to Philemon.

Text 

Aland did not place the Greek text of the codex in any Category.

History 
The manuscript was added to the list of New Testament manuscripts by Johann Martin Augustin Scholz. It was examined by Pasinus. C. R. Gregory saw the manuscript in 1886. Formerly it was labeled by 136a and 169p. In 1908 Gregory gave the number 613 to it.

The manuscript was partially destroyed by fire.

The manuscript currently is housed at the Turin National University Library (C. V. 1), at Turin.

See also 

 List of New Testament minuscules
 Biblical manuscript
 Textual criticism

References

Further reading 

 

Greek New Testament minuscules
12th-century biblical manuscripts